The Minnesota Vikings joined the National Football League (NFL) in 1961. The Vikings' first draft selection as an NFL team was Tommy Mason, a running back from Tulane University. The team's most recent first-round selection is Lewis Cine, a safety from Georgia.

Every April, each NFL franchise seeks to add new players to its roster through a collegiate draft known as the "NFL Annual Player Selection Meeting", more commonly known as the NFL Draft. Teams are ranked in reverse order based on the previous season's record, with team with the worst record picking first, the team with the second-worst record picking second, and so on. The two exceptions to this order are made for teams that appeared in the previous Super Bowl; the Super Bowl champion always picks last and the Super Bowl loser always picks second-last. Teams have the option of trading away their picks to other teams for different picks, players, cash, or a combination thereof. Thus, it is not uncommon for a team's actual draft pick to differ from their assigned draft pick, or for a team to have extra or no draft picks in any round due to these trades.

The Vikings have selected number one overall twice. The Vikings received the first pick in 1961 as an expansion franchise and then again in 1968 when the franchise chose Ron Yary, an offensive tackle from the University of Southern California. The Vikings have used first-round selections on players from the University of Southern California five times, Michigan State University four times, and from the University of Notre Dame, Oklahoma State University, Ohio State University, Florida State University and North Carolina State University three times. The Vikings have drafted 10 running backs, the most common position drafted by the franchise, followed by defensive end (9), defensive tackle (8), defensive back (8) and wide receiver (8). Six eventual Hall of Famers have been selected by the Vikings in the first-round: Carl Eller, Alan Page, Chris Doleman, Randall McDaniel, Ron Yary and Randy Moss.

Key

Player selections

By college

By position

Footnotes

References

Minnesota Vikings
 
First-Round Draft Picks